Ernest Moss (19 October 1949 – 11 July 2021) was an English footballer, most associated with his home town club, Chesterfield, where in three separate spells he made 539 appearances, scoring a club record 192 goals. He was later voted PFA Fans' Favourites and cult hero number one by the club's supporters. His total of 749 league appearances puts him in the top 20 all-time list for Football League appearances.

With Chesterfield he won the Fourth Division title in 1969–70 and 1984–85. He was also promoted out of the fourth tier with Port Vale in 1982–83 and with Doncaster Rovers in 1983–84. He also won the Third Division title with Mansfield Town in 1976–77, and finished second in the Conference with Kettering Town in 1988–89. In addition to these achievements, he was also voted Port Vale F.C. Player of the Year in 1982. Other Football League clubs he played for include Peterborough United, Lincoln City, Stockport County, Scarborough, and Rochdale. He also turned out for non-league sides Matlock Town and Shepshed Charterhouse.

He later embarked on a fifteen-year career as a manager at the non-league level of the English football pyramid, taking charge at Gainsborough Trinity, Leek Town, Matlock Town, Hucknall Town, and Belper Town. He led Gainsborough to a Northern Premier League Challenge Cup and Peter Swales Shield double in 1997, as well as a further Challenge Cup final appearance in 1998. He also won promotion out of the Northern Premier League First Division with Matlock Town in 2003–04. He also worked as Peter Morris's assistant at Boston United and Kettering Town.

Playing career

Chesterfield
Moss worked as a clerk in the Derbyshire County Council education offices at Matlock at the time of his joining his hometown club Chesterfield, in April 1967, from the local Tube Works side. He made his debut at Bradford Park Avenue on 26 October 1968, signing professional forms a few days later before going on to make sixteen further appearances in the season. The club were at a low ebb, and finished 1968–69 just two points above the re-election zone in the Fourth Division.

The "Spireites" were promoted as champions in 1969–70, winning nineteen of their 23 league games at Saltergate. Moss was a major factor in the upturn in form, scoring twenty goals in the campaign, including four past Newport County. In 1970–71 he hit double figures by October, but was then sidelined for a period of months after rupturing his ligaments at Vetch Field. Chesterfield were on the up though, and finished the season fifth in the Third Division, two points off fallen giants Aston Villa. Chesterfield dropped back down to thirteenth in 1971–72, and finished just two points above the relegation zone in 1972–73. They again finished fifth in 1973–74, ending up five points shy of promotion. The club dropped back into the lower half of the table in 1974–75. After 95 goals in 271 league games he was sold to Peterborough United, manager Joe Shaw having found a replacement in Steve Cammack.

Peterborough United and Mansfield Town
Noel Cantwell's "Posh" finished tenth in the Third Division in 1975–76, and Moss then spent the latter half of the 1976–77 season with promotion winning Mansfield Town, who under Peter Morris's stewardship topped the Third Division table on 64 points. After playing for the "Stags" in their first ever season in the Second Division, he returned to the third tier with Chesterfield in January 1979, now managed by Arthur Cox.

Return to Chesterfield
He helped the club to avoid relegation by just four points in 1978–79. The 1979–80 and 1980–81 seasons saw Chesterfield come close to promotion, missing out by one point and three points respectively. He helped the club to win the 1981 Anglo-Scottish Cup. However, he fell out with the club over a £5 pay rise, and in June 1981 he chose to move on to Port Vale.

Port Vale
The Fourth Division club splashed out £12,000 for his services and were to find the sum a good investment. In his debut season he became the club's top scorer with seventeen goals, and picked up the Player of the Year award at the end of the campaign. Vale won promotion from the fourth tier in 1982–83, though Moss had been sold to Colin Murphy's Lincoln City for £1,500 in March 1983, despite still being a regular in the first eleven. Despite his tally of 11 goals in 33 games in 1982–83, manager John McGrath claimed that 'age caught up with him'. McGrath nicknamed Moss and strike partner Bob Newton as the "Kray twins" due to their dominance of opposition defenders.

Later career
His time at Sincil Bank was brief and he finished the 1983–84 season with Doncaster Rovers, as Rovers were promoted from the Fourth Division as runners-up under the management of Billy Bremner. In 1984 Moss signed with Chesterfield for a third time, now under the leadership of John Duncan. He won promotion from the fourth tier for the fourth time, Chesterfield coming up as champions in his first season back at Saltergate. The 1985–86 season was one of consolidation for Chesterfield, and his goals helped greatly. The Saltergate faithful were therefore taken by surprise when he was sold to Fourth Division Stockport County in December 1986, along with Phil Brown, for a combined fee of £10,000. County finished in mid-table, and Moss left at the end of the 1986–87 campaign. He was with Conference champions Scarborough for their first season in the Football League under Neil Warnock. He also had a short spell with strugglers Rochdale, scoring twice in ten games for Eddie Gray's side, before his career in the Football League came to an end.

Refusing to hang up his boots, he went on to play for Kettering Town of the Conference, and hit seventeen goals in 1988–89, making him the club's top-scorer at the age of forty. His goals helped Kettering to finish the season as runners-up, eight points behind Maidstone United. He later played for Matlock Town and Shepshed Charterhouse, before he retired in his second spell with Kettering, in 1992.

Style of play
When Moss was just starting his career, Chesterfield manager Jimmy McGuigan described him as:"A big, willing bloke, a charming fellow who had raw potential. His balance was nil, therefore his ball control was nil. He knew where the goal lay but he couldn't often hit it."

McGuigan worked hard to rectify this aspect of Moss' game and his hard work paid off, the youngster soon formed a deadly partnership with Kevin Randall. McGuigan's training improved his overall abilities, though his heading skills had always been present. Moss always posed an aerial threat and scored many of his goals by towering over defenders and directing the ball into the net. A big man, he was closer to a 'gentle giant' than a dirty player. Football historian Jeff Kent described him as a "wholehearted striker".

Moss claimed that "For me competing was all about the pride and dignity of honest endeavour, - and winning wasn't all about riches and rewards, it was about preserving ones sporting integrity, it was about honour."

None of his goals came from penalty kicks. Moss missed the only penalty he ever took, in his 1986 testimonial match against Sheffield United.

Management career
Also a well travelled non-league manager, he spent 1992 to 1994 as assistant manager to Peter Morris at Boston United. The "Pilgrims" were relegated out of the Conference in 1992–93, and spent 1993–94 in the Northern Premier League. He was appointed manager of Gainsborough Trinity in 1995. He led Trinity to a fifth-place finish in the Northern Premier League in 1995–96, three points behind champions Bamber Bridge. His team finished tenth in 1996–97 but did a cup double, beating Boston United in the final of the Northern Premier League Challenge Cup, and lifting the Peter Swales Shield after victory over league champions Leek Town. Trinity finished fifth again in 1997–98, and lost out to Altrincham in the final of the Challenge Cup.

In June 1998 he took charge at Conference outfit Leek Town, though was dismissed the following year after Leek were relegated, finishing nine points below the safety of Welling United. He was back in charge at Gainsborough by November 1999, replacing Steve Richards. He led the club to another tenth-place finish in 1999–2000. In 2000, he was appointed assistant manager of Kettering Town under Peter Morris, though the pair were sacked in February 2001, with the club bottom of the Conference.

He took the reins at Northern Premier League First Division club Matlock Town in 2001, and took the club to a fourteenth-place finish in 2001–02. He took the "Gladiators" to eighth place in 2002–03, finishing three points off the play-offs. Promotion was achieved in 2003–04, as a second-place finish was enough to take the club in the Premier Division. He was appointed manager at Conference North club Hucknall Town in 2004, but lost his job after just three months. He returned to the Northern Premier League First Division in January 2005, when he was named manager of Belper Town. Belper finished seventeenth in 2004–05, but moved up to ninth in 2005–06, eight points off the play-offs. The "Nailers" dropped down to nineteenth in 2006–07, and Moss was sacked. Moss went on to coach youngsters at Chesterfield's community scheme and performed scouting missions.

Personal life
He married wife Jenny, a nurse, in 1971. They had two daughters; Nikki born in December 1974, and Sarah, in May 1977. Moss established the Moss & Miller sports shop with former England cricketer Geoff Miller.

He was diagnosed with Pick's disease in October 2014. On 11 January 2015, Chesterfield declared their home match with Port Vale as "Ernie Moss Day", where money was raised for dementia charities. On 25 April 2017, a road adjacent to the Proact Stadium was named Ernie Moss Way in his honour. A second "Ernie Moss Day" was celebrated when Port Vale played at Chesterfield on 19 August 2017. At this match a mosaic portrait of Moss by artist Rob Lally was unveiled in the Proact Stadium foyer. He contracted Coronavirus disease 2019 during the COVID-19 pandemic in the United Kingdom and had beaten the disease by the end of May 2020. Moss died on 11 July 2021, aged 71.

Career statistics

Honours

References

External links
List of goals for Chesterfield

1949 births
2021 deaths
Footballers from Chesterfield
Association football forwards
English footballers
English football managers
Chesterfield F.C. players
Peterborough United F.C. players
Mansfield Town F.C. players
Port Vale F.C. players
Lincoln City F.C. players
Doncaster Rovers F.C. players
Stockport County F.C. players
Scarborough F.C. players
Rochdale A.F.C. players
Kettering Town F.C. players
Matlock Town F.C. players
Shepshed Dynamo F.C. players
English Football League players
National League (English football) players
Northern Premier League players
Gainsborough Trinity F.C. managers
Leek Town F.C. managers
Matlock Town F.C. managers
Hucknall Town F.C. managers
Belper Town F.C. managers
National League (English football) managers
Northern Premier League managers
Association football coaches
Association football scouts